Nemanja Miletić (born 26 July 1991) is a Serbian professional footballer who plays as a left midfielder for Javor Ivanjica. For most of his career, he played as a left-back.

Club career

Early years
Born in Loznica, Miletić spent some period in Red Star Belgrade youth categories, being also licensed with the first team for the 2008–09 season. He made his first senior appearances with Serbian League Belgrade side Sopot in 2009. Miletić played with Radnički Stobex during three seasons in the League West. He also spent one season with Mačva Šabac.

Javor Ivanjica
In the summer of 2013, Miletić moved to Javor Ivanjica. He made his official debut for the club in a 4–2 home league win over Red Star Belgrade on 11 August 2013. In his first season at the club, Miletić made 26 appearances in all competitions. After the club got relegated, Miletić played regularly in the Serbian First League next season, helping the team to return in the top tier of Serbian football. As one of the team's most regular players, Miletić was runner-up in the 2015–16 Serbian Cup, playing in the final match against Partizan. During his time at Javor, Miletić was usually used as a left-back, or left centre-back.

Partizan
On 7 June 2016, Miletić signed a four-year deal with Partizan for a transfer fee of €260,000. He chose the number 26 jersey. He made his league debut for Partizan on 10 August 2016, playing the full 90 minutes in a 0–2 away win over his former club Javor Ivanjica. On 11 September 2016, Miletić scored his first goal for Partizan in 0–2 away win against Borac Čačak. On 9 September 2017, Miletić scored in a 3–0 victory over Mladost Lučani. Miletić also scored in a 2–0 victory over Radnik Surdulica.

Ufa
On 26 February 2021, he signed a long-term contract with Russian Premier League club Ufa. Miletić left Ufa on 30 May 2022 following its relegation from the Russian Premier League.

Return to Javor
On 20 December 2022, Miletić returned to Javor Ivanjica on a one-year deal.

International career
Miletić was called up to the Serbia national football team by coach Slavoljub Muslin in September 2016, making his international debut in a friendly 3–0 loss to Qatar. He also received a call-up for a friendly match against United States, playing the full 90 minutes in a 0–0 away draw in San Diego on 29 January 2017.

Career statistics

Club

International

Honours
Partizan
 Serbian SuperLiga: 2016–17
 Serbian Cup (2): 2016–17, 2017–18

References

External links

 
 
 

1991 births
Living people
Sportspeople from Loznica
Association football midfielders
Association football defenders
Serbian footballers
Serbia international footballers
FK Radnički Klupci players
FK Mačva Šabac players
FK Javor Ivanjica players
FK Partizan players
Korona Kielce players
Olympiakos Nicosia players
FC Ufa players
Serbian First League players
Serbian SuperLiga players
Cypriot First Division players
Russian Premier League players
Serbian expatriate footballers
Expatriate footballers in Poland
Expatriate footballers in Cyprus
Expatriate footballers in Russia